Meiglyptes is a genus of Southeast Asian birds in the family woodpecker family Picidae.

The genus was introduced by the English naturalist William John Swainson in 1837 with the white-rumped woodpecker (Meiglyptes tristis) as the type species. The name combines the Ancient Greek meiōn meaning "smaller" or "lesser" with gluptēs meaning "carver". The genus belongs to the tribe Picini within the woodpecker subfamily Picinae. The genus is sister to the rufous woodpecker in its own monotypic genus Micropternus.

The genus contains 3 species.

References

 
Bird genera
 
Taxonomy articles created by Polbot